Godfred Donsah (born 7 June 1996) is a Ghanaian professional footballer who plays as a midfielder for Turkish club Yeni Malatyaspor.

Club career
Born in Accra, Donsah made his senior debuts with local DC United Agogo before signing a contract with Palermo. Before signing with Palermo, he had trials at A.S. Roma, but nothing came of it. He joined Verona in summer 2013.

Donsah made his first team – and Serie A – debut on 19 April 2014, coming on as a substitute in a 2–1 win at Atalanta.

On 17 July 2014, he joined Cagliari for a fee of €2.16 million.

On 24 August 2015, Bologna announced the signing of Donsah on loan with a conditional obligation to buy if Donsah made his debut, for a total fee of €7 million (€2.5M+€4.5M). Donsah signed a four-year contract. Donsah made his debut on 29 August, a match losing to Sassuolo 1–0.

On 1 October 2020, Donsah joined Turkish Süper Lig club Çaykur Rizespor on loan for the 2020–21 season.

On 27 August 2021, Donsah terminated his contract with Bologna and then moved outright to Crotone, with whom he signed a two-year contract. He left for Yeni Malatyaspor in Turkey in January 2022.

Career statistics

References

External links

1996 births
Living people
Footballers from Accra
Ghanaian footballers
Ghana under-20 international footballers
Association football midfielders
Serie A players
Belgian Pro League players
Süper Lig players
Serie B players
TFF First League players
Cagliari Calcio players
Hellas Verona F.C. players
Bologna F.C. 1909 players
Cercle Brugge K.S.V. players
Çaykur Rizespor footballers
F.C. Crotone players
Yeni Malatyaspor footballers
Ghanaian expatriate footballers
Ghanaian expatriate sportspeople in Italy
Expatriate footballers in Italy
Ghanaian expatriate sportspeople in Belgium
Expatriate footballers in Belgium
Ghanaian expatriate sportspeople in Turkey
Expatriate footballers in Turkey